Los Cabos Fútbol Club is a Mexican professional football team based in Cabo San Lucas, Baja California Sur, Mexico currently playing in Liga de Balompié Mexicano. During the 2020-21 season it is the only professional team in Baja California Sur.

History
The team was founded on July 21, 2020 as the 18th LBM franchise. It was the third professional soccer team in Los Cabos, after Delfines de Los Cabos F.C., which competed in the Segunda División between 2007 and 2011, and the Club Guerreros Pericúes which played between 2011 and 2017 in the Tercera División.

On July the club introduced Joel Sánchez as its first manager. On August 1, goalkeeper Carlos Velázquez was announced as the first player in the club's history. Los Cabos was the first club to sign a player from a team affiliated with the FMF, it was Ismael Valadéz, player of Leones Negros UdeG, team of the Liga de Expansión MX.

Before starting the season, the team announced the construction of its own stadium, called Yenekamu, which will have a capacity of approximately 22,000 spectators.

On December 1, 2020, the club's franchise was put on hiatus by the LBM due to financial problems and the lack of a new board of directors that can provide financial support to the club. The team could return in the following season if it manages to improve its financial situation and complies with the guidelines of the competition.

Stadium
Provisionally, Los Cabos F.C. plays its home games at the Don Koll Sports Complex, with a capacity for 3,500 spectators. However, the club is building a provisional stadium in the same place where its future venue will be located. When this work is finished it will be able to host 7,000 spectators, it will temporarily have mobile stands. In 2022 the official stadium is expected to be ready.

Players

First-team squad

References

Cabo San Lucas
Football clubs in Baja California Sur
Association football clubs established in 2020
2020 establishments in Mexico
Liga de Balompié Mexicano Teams